In continuum mechanics, a hypoelastic material is an elastic material that has a constitutive model independent of finite strain measures except in the linearized case.  Hypoelastic material models are distinct from hyperelastic material models (or standard elasticity models) in that, except under special circumstances, they cannot be derived from a strain energy density function.

Overview
A hypoelastic material can be rigorously defined as one that is modeled using a constitutive equation satisfying the following two criteria:

 The Cauchy stress  at time  depends only on the order in which the body has occupied its past configurations, but not on the time rate at which these past configurations were traversed. As a special case, this criterion includes a Cauchy elastic material, for which the current stress depends only on the current configuration rather than the history of past configurations.

If only these two original criteria are used to define hypoelasticity, then hyperelasticity would be included as a special case, which prompts some constitutive modelers to append a third criterion that specifically requires a hypoelastic model to not be hyperelastic (i.e., hypoelasticity implies that stress is not derivable from an energy potential). If this third criterion is adopted, it follows that a hypoelastic material might admit nonconservative adiabatic loading paths that start and end with the same deformation gradient but do not start and end at the same internal energy.

Note that the second criterion requires only that the function  exists. As explained below, specific formulations of hypoelastic models typically employ a so-called objective stress rate so that the  function exists only implicitly.

Hypoelastic material models frequently take the form

In hyperelasticity, the tangent stiffness generally must also depend on the deformation gradient in order to properly account for distortion and rotation of anisotropic material fiber directions.

Hypoelasticity and objective stress rates 
In many practical problems of solid mechanics, it is sufficient to characterize material deformation by the small (or linearized) strain tensor

where  are the components of the displacements of continuum points, the subscripts refer to Cartesian coordinates  , and the subscripts preceded by a comma denote partial derivatives (e.g.,
). But there are also many problems where the finiteness of strain must be taken into account. These are of two kinds:
 inelastic deformations possessing no potential, in which the stress-strain relation is defined incrementally.

In the former kind, the total strain formulation described in the article on finite strain theory is appropriate.  In the latter kind an incremental (or rate) formulation is necessary and must be used in every load or time step of a finite element computer program using updated Lagrangian procedure.  The absence of a potential raises intricate questions due to the freedom in the choice of finite strain measure and characterization of the stress rate.

For a sufficiently small loading step (or increment), one may use the deformation rate tensor (or velocity strain)

or increment

representing the linearized strain increment from the initial (stressed and deformed) state in the step. Here the superior dot represents the material time derivative ( following a given material particle),  denotes a small increment over the step,  = time, and  = material point velocity or displacement rate.

However, it would not be objective to use the time derivative of the Cauchy (or true) stress . This stress, which describes the forces on a small material element imagined to be cut out from the material as currently deformed, is not objective because it varies with rigid body rotations of the material. The material points must be characterized by their initial coordinates  (called Lagrangian) because different material particles are contained in the element that is cut out (at the same location) before and after the incremental deformation.

Consequently, it is necessary to introduce the so-called objective stress rate , or the corresponding increment . It means that that  must be invariant with respect to coordinate transformations (particularly rotations) and must characterize the state of the same material element as it deforms.

See also 
 Stress measures
 Hyperelastic material
 Objective stress rates
 Principle of material objectivity
 Finite strain theory
 Infinitesimal strain theory

Notes

Bibliography 
 

Continuum mechanics
Elasticity (physics)